Luís Filipe Vieira Carvalha (born 6 January 1967), known as Litos, is a Portuguese former footballer who played as a midfielder, currently a manager.

Playing career
Litos was born in São João da Madeira, Aveiro District. As Sporting CP was coached by John Toshack, he made his first-team debut at the age of 17. His best individual season would be precisely his first – 28 matches, six goals, even reaching the Portugal national team– and he remained an important member of the main squad the following years.

Litos left the Lions in 1992, and represented, without much success at least in his country's Primeira Liga, Boavista FC, S.C. Braga, G.D. Estoril Praia, US Lusitanos Saint-Maur (third division, in France) and Atlético Clube de Portugal. He retired from the game in 1999, aged 32.

Coaching career
Litos began working as a manager in 2004, starting with former club Estoril and not being able to prevent relegation from the top flight. In the 2009–10 campaign, he led Portimonense S.C. back to the same league after a two-decade absence.

Litos was fired by Portimonense in late December 2010, as the Algarve side ranked second-bottom. Shortly after, he signed for Leixões S.C. of the second tier, leaving the club on 14 February 2012.

Starting in 2012, Litos went on to spend several seasons in the Moçambola with Liga Desportiva de Maputo. In February 2016, he returned his country and its second division, leaving Clube Oriental de Lisboa's bench after less than one month alleging personal reasons.

References

External links

1967 births
Living people
People from São João da Madeira
Sportspeople from Aveiro District
Portuguese footballers
Association football midfielders
Primeira Liga players
Liga Portugal 2 players
Segunda Divisão players
A.D. Sanjoanense players
Sporting CP footballers
Boavista F.C. players
S.C. Braga players
G.D. Estoril Praia players
Atlético Clube de Portugal players
Championnat National players
US Lusitanos Saint-Maur players
Portugal youth international footballers
Portugal under-21 international footballers
Portugal international footballers
Portuguese expatriate footballers
Expatriate footballers in France
Portuguese expatriate sportspeople in France
Portuguese football managers
Primeira Liga managers
Liga Portugal 2 managers
G.D. Estoril Praia managers
Portimonense S.C. managers
Leixões S.C. managers
C.D. Maxaquene managers
Liga Desportiva de Maputo managers
Portuguese expatriate football managers
Expatriate football managers in Mozambique
Portuguese expatriate sportspeople in Mozambique